Inside is the tenth album by the Christian rock band White Heart and the band's only album with John Thorn on bass guitar and also the final album for both lead guitarist Brian Wooten and drummer Jon Knox. The band stylized its name as Whiteheart for this album. It is the first of two albums released on Curb Records. The album was produced by Ken Scott, whose producing and engineering credits include the Beatles,
Elton John, Supertramp and David Bowie. Whiteheart's sound was scaled back from the arena rock from their previous releases to a more modern rock sound. Music videos were made for "Even the Hardest Heart" and "Inside".

Track listing
 "Inside" (Billy Smiley, Rick Florian) – 4:27
 "You Can't Take What You Don't Have (You Don't Have Me)" (Smiley, Brian Wooten) – 4:56
 "It Could Have Been You" (Smiley, Mark Gersmehl) – 3:54
 "Come One Come All" (Gersmehl, Smiley, Wooten, Jon Knox) – 4:43
 "Ritual" (Gersmehl, Smiley) – 5:56
 "Living Sacrifice" (Knox, Smiley, Wooten) – 4:52
 "Dominate" (Gersmehl) – 4:04
 "Even the Hardest Heart" (Gersmehl, Smiley, Wooten) – 4:27
 "Speak Softly" (Gersmehl, Smiley) – 5:06
 "Find a Way" (Gersmehl, Smiley) – 5:54

Personnel 

White Heart
 Rick Florian – lead and backing vocals
 Mark Gersmehl – organ, pianos, synthesizers, lead and backing vocals
 Billy Smiley – acoustic guitar, electric guitar, backing vocals
 Brian Wooten – electric guitar, acoustic guitar, lead guitar
 John Thorn – electric bass, acoustic bass, backing vocals
 Jon Knox – drums, percussion

Additional musicians
 Bob Parr – fretless bass (9)
 Eric Darken – percussion (1–3, 5, 8)
 Steve Brewster – percussion (8)
 Claire West – backing vocals
 Mike Wilson – backing vocals

Production 
 Claire Parr – executive producer
 Ken Scott – producer, engineer,  mixing
 Richie Biggs – assistant producer, assistant engineer
 Mark Gersmehl – assistant engineer
 Jared Johnson –  assistant engineer
 Shawn McLean – assistant engineer
 Billy Smiley – assistant engineer
 Dave Donnelly – mastering
 John Scarpati – photography
 Neuman, Walker & Associates – art direction and design

Studios
 The Bennett House, Franklin, Tennessee – recording location
 Shakin' Studios, Franklin, Tennessee – recording location
 Total Access Recording, Redondo Beach, California – mixing location
 Digital Dynamics – mastering location

Critical reception 

Tony Cummings of Cross Rhythms gave Inside a perfect 10 out of 10 saying that Ken Scott's production is "state-of-the-art with the tracks having a dynamic resonance that only big studio budgets can produce while several songs are from the top drawer. The title track with screaming wah-influenced lead guitars and trippy multi-tracked vocals; a cool and subdued ballad "Speak Softly" (with vocal by keyboardist Mark Gersmehl); and "Ritual" a broody rocker with a Hammond B-3 sound and an anthemic chant of "dance, dance, dance" are all wonderful. Let's hope mainstream music giant Curb get their investment back on the lads. Either way they've helped the Nashville rockers make a cracking Christian rock album.

Radio singles

References

1995 albums
White Heart albums
Albums produced by Ken Scott
Curb Records albums